Aloeides merces, the Wakkerstroom copper, is a species of butterfly in the family Lycaenidae. It is endemic to South Africa, where it is known from sour montane grassveld in KwaZulu-Natal and Mpumalanga.

The wingspan is 24–28 mm for males and 26–30 mm females. Adults are on wing from October to November. There is one generation per year.

References

Aloeides
Butterflies described in 1986
Endemic butterflies of South Africa
Taxonomy articles created by Polbot